Setter Hill is a hill in Tingwall, Shetland, Scotland.

References

Geography of Shetland
Mountains and hills of the Scottish islands